A Beit (also spelled bait,   , literally "a house") is a metrical unit of Arabic, Iranian, Urdu and Sindhi poetry. It corresponds to a line, though sometimes improperly renderered as "couplet" since each beit is divided into two hemistichs of equal length, each containing two, three or four feet, or from 16 to 32 syllables.

William Alexander Clouston concluded that this fundamental part of Arabic prosody originated with the Bedouins or Arabs of the desert, as, in the nomenclature of the different parts of the line, one foot is called "a tent-pole", another "tent-peg" and the two hemistichs of the verse are called after the folds or leaves of the double-door of the tent or "house".

Through Ottoman Turkish, it got into Albanian and the bards of Muslim tradition in the Albanian literature took their name after this metrical unit, the poets known as bejtexhi, meaning literally meaning "couplet makers".

References

Poetic rhythm
Arabic and Central Asian poetics
Indian poetics
Sindhi folklore
Urdu-language poetry
Islamic poetry
Albanian poetry